The World's Biggest Gang Bang III – The Houston 620 is a 1999 pornographic film directed by Greg Alves. The film is hosted by Ron Jeremy, and stars Houston in a gang bang format. The film won the 2000 AVN Award for being the 'Best Selling Tape" of 1999.

References

External links

Konformist.com

1999 films
1990s pornographic films
American pornographic films
1990s English-language films
1990s American films